On December 18, 2022, Earl Moore Jr. died after being tightly strapped face down on a stretcher by paramedics in Springfield, Illinois. Moore, who was in distress and suffering from hallucinations and alcohol withdrawal, was yelled at and dragged by paramedic Peggy Finley, before she and partner Peter Cadigan strapped him to the stretcher. Moore was taken to the hospital, where he died an hour later.

On January 9, 2023, Cadigan and Finley were charged with first-degree murder after an autopsy concluded that Moore's death was a homicide as a result of compressional and positional asphyxia.

Death 
On the morning of December 18, 2022, police responded to a call at Moore's residence about a person in possession of firearms. After arriving, they found Moore in medical distress after detoxing, and called an ambulance. Paramedics Peter Cadigan and Peggy Finley arrived, where Finley yelled at Moore to "sit up" and "quit acting stupid." Moore, who was unable to walk, was carried to the ambulance by police as he was refused assistance by Cadigan and Finley. The paramedics then strapped him in a prone position on the stretcher before taking him to the hospital, where he later died.

An autopsy ruled Moore's death a homicide, and was caused by “prone face-down restraint on a paramedic transportation cot/stretcher by tightened straps across the back."

Legal proceedings 
Both Cadigan and Finley were charged with first-degree murder, and are held in the Sangamon County Jail. They are facing 20 to 60 years in prison.

Moore's family filed a wrongful death lawsuit against the paramedics involved, as well as LifeStar Ambulance Services. They are represented by Ben Crump and Robert C. Hilliard.

References 

Deaths from asphyxiation
Medical controversies in the United States
2022 deaths
December 2022 events in the United States
2022 controversies in the United States
2023 controversies in the United States